Castlevania is a video game series created and published by Konami. Titles in the series have been released on numerous video game consoles, handheld game consoles, and personal computer platforms, and several have been re-released on multiple platforms and included as part of compilation packages. 

The series' characters have appeared in several other Konami games. There have been also numerous separately released music albums, initially by King Records.

Video games

Original series

Lords of Shadow series

Spin-offs

Compilations and collections

Cancelled titles

Related titles
There are parody or cameo games created by Konami that have Castlevania elements or characters.

Other media

Music albums

Notes

References

External links
 Akumajō Dracula series at Konami Tokyo 
 Castlevania series at Konami USA

 
C
Castlevania
Horror fiction lists